Mick Brennan (born 17 May 1952, in Salford) is an English retired professional footballer. He played as a forward or a midfielder.

In 1977, Micky Brennan is listed with the Cleveland State University men's soccer team. He is then listed as having played for the Cleveland Cobras of the American Soccer League in 1978.
He returned to the Uk and played for Telford Utd under Gordon Banks in 1980 and also played for KidderminsteR Harriers who won the Worcs Senior cup Staffs senior cup and promotion to the alliance LG 
He also played for Worcester City , Alvechurh and Redditch Utd
He played twice for the England FA team non league v British Universities and Northern premier LG select 
He was player manager at Evesham Utd at 28 as he retired early due to injury and went on to spend 20 yrs at Evesham as manager and Director of Football

References

External links

1952 births
Living people
English footballers
Macclesfield Town F.C. players
Manchester City F.C. players
Rochdale A.F.C. players
Stockport County F.C. players
Cleveland State Vikings men's soccer players
Footballers from Salford
Association football forwards
Association football midfielders
Northwich Victoria F.C. players
Witton Albion F.C. players
Oswestry Town F.C. players
Mossley A.F.C. players
English expatriate footballers
English expatriate sportspeople in the United States
Expatriate soccer players in the United States
Cleveland Cobras players